Paperny Entertainment Inc. (previously known as Paperny Films) was  a Vancouver-based producer of television programming and films, ranging from character-driven documentaries to provocative comedy to quirky reality shows. It was founded by David Paperny, who was nominated for an Academy Award for his 1993 documentary The Broadcast Tapes of Dr. Peter.

In July 2014, Paperny Entertainment was acquired by Entertainment One, which in turn has been acquired by American toy manufacturer Hasbro on December 30, 2019.

Television series
Listed by the year the shows first aired.

2001
 KinK (Showcase, 5 seasons, 63 episodes)

2005
 Crash Test Mommy (Life Network)

2007
 Road Hockey Rumble (OLN, 26 episodes)
 My Fabulous Gay Wedding (Global, Logo, 2 seasons, 19 episodes)

2008
 The Week the Women Went (CBC, 2 seasons, 16 episodes)
 Jetstream (Discovery, 8 episodes)

2009
The 100 Mile Challenge (Food Network Canada, 6 episodes) 
Combat School (Discovery, 6 episodes, follow-up to Jetstream) 
Glutton for Punishment (US Food Network, 5 seasons, 56 episodes) 
The Stagers (HGTV Canada, two seasons, 26 episodes)
 Chop Shop (Slice, 13 episodes)

2010

2011
 Eat St. (Food Network Canada, 3 seasons to date) 
 Dust Up (6 episodes)
 Consumed (HGTV Canada, one season)
 Dussault Inc. (City, 2 seasons, 32 episodes)

2012
 World's Weirdest Restaurants (Food Network Canada, one season)

2013
 Yukon Gold (History Channel)

2014
 Chopped Canada (Food Network Canada)

Documentaries
The documentary The Boys of Buchenwald (2002) and Love Shines (2010) were produced by Paperny.

In 2008 Paperny partnered with David Ridgen and John Fleming on "The Civil Rights Cold Case Project" with the Center for Investigative Reporting. The project brought together partners from across the media and legal spectrum to reveal long-neglected truths behind scores of race-motivated murders from the civil rights era, and to help facilitate reconciliation and healing. The project sponsored work in civil rights-era cold cases, including that of African American shoe-shop owner Frank Morris who was murdered by the Klan in Ferriday, Louisiana in 1964, and that of Clifton Walker, a Natchez Mississippi mill worker murdered by Klan members the same year.

The documentary film Confessions of an Innocent Man (2007), which tells the story of a British-Canadian engineer William Sampson, won a Gemini Award for Best Biography Documentary Program.

References

External links
Paperny Films

Entertainment One
Film production companies of Canada
Television production companies of Canada
Mass media companies established in 1994
2014 mergers and acquisitions
Companies based in Vancouver
Documentary film production companies